Proto-South Dravidian is the linguistic reconstruction of the common ancestor of the south Dravidian languages. Its descendants include Tamil, Kannada, Malayalam, Tulu, Badaga, Kodava, Irula, Kota and Toda.

It has been estimated that Proto-South Dravidian existed until the beginning of the 7th century BCE. However, knowledge of the early history of Dravidian languages remains limited.

References 

Dravidian languages
South Dravidian